Bahbari is a census village in Tamulpur district, Assam, India. According to the 2011 Census of India, the Bahbari village has a total population of 4,214 people including 2,150 males and 2,064 females with a literacy rate of 68.58%.

References 

Villages in Assam